John Harty (born 9 March 1941) is an Irish equestrian. He competed in two events at the 1964 Summer Olympics.

References

External links
 

1941 births
Living people
Irish male equestrians
Olympic equestrians of Ireland
Equestrians at the 1964 Summer Olympics
Place of birth missing (living people)